Rita Bouboulidi is a Greek pianist. She studied at the Conservatoire de Paris where she was taught by Lazare Levy. Her international career has earned great praise from critics.

Discography
 Robert Schumann, Sonata No. 2 in G minor
 Op. 22; Johannes Brahms Two Rhapsodies
 Op. 79. Rita Bouboulidi, piano. 25 cm 33 rpm disc EFM42024 Erato, coll. "Fiori musicali", 1957 (Record BNF No. FRBNF37873387m)
 Johannes Brahms, Concerto No. 1 in D minor for piano and orchestra. Rita Bouboulidi, piano and  Orchestra of the Conservatory Concert Society, led by Luis Herrera de la Fuente. 30 cm 33 rpm disc Charlin SLC21, [undated], (Long BNF No. FRBNF378157916).

Notes

References

 Excerpt from a commentary accompanying the recording of his second piano concerto of Brahms / Disc LP Charlin SLC 21 Orchestre de la Societe des Concerts du Conservatoire, executive Luis Herrera de la Fuente (recorded in Paris in the years 1965 (?) .

Living people
20th-century pianists
Greek pianists
Greek women pianists
21st-century pianists
Year of birth missing (living people)
Women classical pianists
20th-century women pianists
21st-century women pianists